The Atlantic Garden was a beer garden and music hall established by William Kramer in 1858 at what is now 50 Bowery in the Chinatown neighborhood of Manhattan in New York City. It was next to the Bowery Theatre, on the site of the Bull's Head Tavern (formerly headquarters for New York's cattle market) and the New York Hotel. The premises extended west to a secondary frontage on Elizabeth Street.

The Bowery Theatre was  built as a fashionable theater, but by the 1850s it came to cater to immigrant groups; the Germans especially patronized Atlantic Garden, which featured a theater behind the beer hall, where the new entertainment of "variety" acts were presented along with popular music concerts. In 1910, following the neighborhood's changing dynamic, Atlantic Garden switched to presenting Yiddish theatre.

In 2013, the Chu family razed structures on the site to make way for a high-rise hotel. Although there were rumors that the site might have contained remnants of the old Bull's Head Tavern, an archeological excavation did not find any such evidence.

References

External links
 50 Bowery: Phase IB Archaeological Monitoring and Field Testing of the 50 Bowery site (Block 202, Lot 23), New York, New York

1850s in New York (state)
1858 establishments in New York (state)
Beer gardens in the United States
Beer in New York City
Chinatown, Manhattan
Former theatres in Manhattan
German-American culture in New York City